The Neotia Institute of Technology Management and Science or NITMAS. is a private engineering college in the state of West Bengal, India. Situated on Diamond Harbor Road  on the south western fringes of Kolkata, the institute is affiliated to the
Maulana Abul Kalam Azad University of Technology formerly Known as West Bengal University of Technology  and approved by All India Council of Technical Education (AICTE) and Directorate General of Shipping, India.

About
The institute was established in 2002. Neotia Institute of Technology Management and Science was previously known as Institute of Technology and Marine Engineering(ITME). From 2006 the college started a three-year graduate program in Bachelor of Nautical Science. As of 2010, the institute comes under the Ambuja Neotia Group'''.

Campus

The college is entirely residential. There is a residential arrangement for some of the professors, faculty lecturers, and other staff members. A medical health center is situated inside the campus. There are seven hostels:

 Hostel 4 - boys of all the streams (except for the marine engineering and B.N.S.) from 2nd year onwards
 Hostel 3 - Girls of all depts.

The campus is spread over a  area, with outdoor and indoor sports facilities like cricket, soccer, basketball, table tennis, carrom etc.
The campus has a Tea Junction, Cyber Cafe and a cafeteria along with stationary shops. The campus is Wi-Fi enabled and has a swimming pool. There is a gym and a beauty salon.

The institute has a model ship on campus for training marine engineers.

Academics
The college offers undergraduate bachelor's degree courses under West Bengal University of Technology in the following disciplines :
 Bio-technology
 Computer Science & Engineering
 Electrical and Electronics Engineering
 Electronics and communication Engineering
 Marine Engineering
 Mechanical Engineering
 B.Sc in Nautical Science (three years)

master's degree courses are offered for
 M.Tech in VLSI Design

See also

References

External links
 www.nitmas.edu.in
 www.wbut.net
 infinitecourses
 WBUT affiliated college list
 ambuja group
 website
Maulana Abul Kalam Azad University of Technology

Maritime colleges in India
Colleges affiliated to West Bengal University of Technology
Engineering colleges in Kolkata
2002 establishments in West Bengal
Educational institutions established in 2002